Dorothy Lucey (born November 19, 1958) is an American entertainment reporter who formerly co-hosted Good Day L.A., the morning news program on Los Angeles Fox affiliate KTTV.

Career
Lucey graduated from George Washington University in 1979 with a degree in political science before going into television reporting. She was an on-air reporter for WNEP-TV in Scranton, Pennsylvania and WABC-TV in New York City (including a stint alongside Regis Philbin), and later joined NBC Sports. She was also a co-host of Attitudes, a talk show on Lifetime Television in the 1990s. In 1992, she hosted the CBS series How'd They Do That.

Lucey joined Good Day LA in 1995 as the show's entertainment reporter. Much of the show's formula consists of wide-ranging banter between the three anchors.  She also has had bit roles in a few movies and TV shows, often playing as a TV reporter.

Lucey's 17-year run with Good Day LA came to an end on May 25, 2012 as a result of non-renewal of her contract.

Personal life
Lucey has been married since 1993 to KCBS investigative reporter David Goldstein, and they have a young son together named Nash. Nash figured a lot in Lucey's on-air discussions, but he has rarely been seen on camera.

Lucey also regularly discusses her religious revival - she converted from Roman Catholicism to a devout form of Presbyterianism several years ago. On the October 26, 2006 broadcast of Good Day L.A., she described herself as a "liberal Christian."

Filmography

External links

Dorothy Lucey's bio page on KTTV's Web site
2003 article about Dorothy Lucey from The Times-Tribune in Scranton, Pennsylvania

1958 births
American film actresses
American Presbyterians
American reporters and correspondents
American television actresses
American television journalists
American women television journalists
Columbian College of Arts and Sciences alumni
American infotainers
Living people
Television anchors from Los Angeles
Place of birth missing (living people)